Melicope peninsularis is a species of small tree in the family Rutaceae and is endemic to tropical north Queensland. It has trifoliate leaves and white flowers borne in short panicles in leaf axils.

Description

Taxonomy
Melicope peninsularis was first formally described in 2001 by Thomas Gordon Hartley in the journal Allertonia from specimens collected in the Lockerbie Scrub in 1992.

Distribution and habitat
This melicope grows in rainforest and is only known from the tip of Cape York Peninsula and on Darnley Island in the Torres Strait.

Conservation status
This species is classified as of "least concern" under the Queensland Government Nature Conservation Act 1992.

References

peninsularis
Sapindales of Australia
Flora of Queensland
Plants described in 2001
Taxa named by Thomas Gordon Hartley